These are the official results of the men's high jump event at the 1983 IAAF World Championships in Helsinki, Finland. There were a total of 38 participating athletes, with two qualifying groups and the final held on 13 August 1983.

Medalists

Schedule
All times are Eastern European Time (UTC+2)

Records

Results

Qualifying round
Held on Friday 1983-08-12

Final

See also
 1980 Men's Olympic High Jump (Moscow)
 1982 Men's European Championships High Jump (Athens)
 1984 Men's Olympic High Jump (Los Angeles)
 1986 Men's European Championships High Jump (Stuttgart)
 1987 Men's World Championships High Jump (Rome)

References

 Results

H
High jump at the World Athletics Championships